Liozna District is a second-level administrative subdivision (raion) of Belarus in the Vitebsk Region.

References

 
Districts of Vitebsk Region